Arensharde (Danish: Arns Herred) is an Amt ("collective municipality") in the district of Schleswig-Flensburg, in Schleswig-Holstein, Germany. Its seat is in Silberstedt. It was formed on 1 January 2008 from the former Ämter Schuby and Silberstedt.

The Amt Arensharde consists of the following municipalities:

Bollingstedt
Ellingstedt 
Hollingstedt 
Hüsby 
Jübek 
Lürschau 
Schuby
Silberstedt
Treia

References

Ämter in Schleswig-Holstein